Chambar, or Chamber, is a town of Tando Allahyar District in the Sindh province of Pakistan. It is headquarters of Chamber Taluka (an administrative subdivision of the district). The town itself is administratively subdivided into two Union councils.

Etymology 
The word Chambar is derived from the Sindhi language; it means "to cling to someone". Chambar is also the Sindhi caste which live in the Sindh province of Pakistan.

Climate 
Geographically, the climate of Chambar is warm in the winter as well as in summer.

Industry 
The industrial factors which affect the industrial condition of city chambar is the production of sugar from Chamber Sugar Mill Pvt Ltd owned by Anwer Majeed.

Revenue collection 
The strongest source of revenue collection from the city chambar is the Maalpirri; and T.M.O collects revenues from the maalpirri as well as the fruit and vegetable selling carts which runs on the road. The Chairman of T.C of city Chamber (2018) is Mr. Jabram Amin Hyderi.

Population 
The total population of Chambar is  more than 25000.

Ethnicity 
There are many castes living in the city chambar including Kumbhar, Memon, Laghari, Khatti, Punjabi, Brohi, Samoo, Pathan, Noondani, Hindus which are basically Maheshwaris and Lohanas. Maheshwaris includes Rathi, Dewani and Satgur out of which Dewanis are to be well knowned by educational background.

Religion 
Most of the population of Chambar belongs to religion Islam and minority of the population belongs to Hinduism and Christianity.

Transportation 
There is not any airport or railway station system in the city. There is only one route by road which is known as Chamber Road; it connects Tando-Allahyar with Badin and many other cities of Sindh.

See also
 Ramapir Temple Tando Allahyar

References 7. سياسي شخصيت "محمد امين حيدري

Populated places in Tando Allahyar District
Union councils of Sindh